John Reid Jr. (born  – 8 October 1946) was a Scottish professional golfer. He finished in tenth place in the 1895 U.S. Open.

Early life
Reid was born circa 1870 in Scotland and emigrated to the United States.

Golf career

1895 U.S. Open
Reid finished in tenth place in the 1895 U.S. Open, held on Friday, 4 October, at Newport Golf Club in Newport, Rhode Island. Horace Rawlins won the tournament which was the first playing of the U.S. Open. He won by two strokes ahead of runner-up Willie Dunn. Reid carded rounds of 100-106=206 and did not receive any prize money for his effort.

Match against Harry Vardon
In October 1900, Reid and Val Fitzjohn took on Harry Vardon in a match at Albany, New York. A cold rain pelted the players and spectators during the event which Vardon won by the score of 2 up.

Match against Walter Fovargue
Reid had much better luck in a high stakes winner-take-all challenge match for $200 against Walter Fovargue in 1903 that was played at the Philadelphia Cricket Club. He defeated Fovargue and took home the hefty $200 prize. The first prize at the U.S. Open that year was only $150.

Death
Reid died at his home in Yonkers, New York on 8 October 1946 at the age of 76.

References

Scottish male golfers
Scottish emigrants to the United States
Year of birth uncertain
1946 deaths